Broke: Who Killed the Middle Classes? is a 2013 book by David Boyle.  It examines the living standards of the middle class in the UK, and concludes they are in steep decline, with opportunities once available to many now only available to a few.  It then seeks to identify the policies and people responsible.

References

External links
 Broke: Who Killed the Middle Classes? (author website)

2013 non-fiction books
Books about economic policy
Fourth Estate books